In biology, the BBCH-scale for cucurbits describes the phenological development of cucurbits, such as cucumber, melon, pumpkin, marrow, squash, calabash and watermelon, using the BBCH-scale.

The phenological growth stages and BBCH-identification keys of cucurbits are:

References
 

BBCH-scale